The Italian Catholic diocese of Fabriano-Matelica in the Marche has existed under this name since 1986. It is a suffragan of the archdiocese of Ancona-Osimo.

History
The history of Fabriano is closely connected with that of the Marches. In the church of San Benedetto, of the Silvestrine monks, is the tomb of Giovanni Bonnelli, a Silvestrine (d. 1290). Silvestro Guzzoli, the founder of this order, is buried at Monte Fano, not far from Fabriano, where Giuseppe dei Conti Atti and Ugo Laico, both Silvestrines, are also buried.

The city was under the jurisdiction of the diocese of Camerino until 8 July 1785, when Pope Pius VI re-established the old Diocese of Matelica and united it aeque principaliter with Fabriano. In 487, Bishop Equitius of Matelica was at Rome; and in 551, Bishop Florentius accompanied Pope Vigilius to Constantinople. No other bishops of the ancient see are known. Until 1785, the Diocese of Matelica also was under the jurisdiction of Camerino.

Ordinaries

Diocese of Fabriano
Erected: 15 November 1728
Latin Name: Fabrianensis

Cosma Torrelli (1728–1736 Died)
Ippolito de Rossi (1736–1746 Appointed, Bishop of Senigallia)
Francesco Viviani (1746–1767 Died)
Luigi Amici (1768–1785 Resigned)

Diocese of Fabriano e Matelica
United: 8 July 1785 with the Diocese of Matelica
Latin Name: Fabrianensis et Mathelicensis
Immediately Subject to the Holy See

Nicola Zoppetti, O.S.A. (1785–1796 Died)
Giovanni Francesco Capelletti (1800–1806 Appointed, Bishop of Ascoli Piceno)
Domenico Buttaoni (1806–1822 Died)
Pietro Balducci (1822–1837 Died)
Francesco Faldi (1837–1858 Resigned)
Antonio Maria Valenziani (1858–1876 Died)
Leopoldo Angelo Santanché, O.F.M. (1876–1883 Died)
Macario Sorini (1883–1893 Resigned)
Aristide Golfieri (1895–1895 Appointed, Bishop of Città di Castello)
Luciano Gentilucci (1895–1909 Died)
Pietro Zanolini (1910–1913 Appointed, Bishop of Lodi)
Andrea Cassulo (1914–1921 Appointed, Titular Archbishop of Leontopolis in Augustamnica)
Luigi Ermini (1921–1945 Died)
Lucio Crescenzi (1945–1960 Died)
Macario Tinti (1960–1978 Retired)
Luigi Scuppa (1978–2001 Died)
Giancarlo Vecerrica (2002–2016 Retired)
Stefano Russo (2016–2019)
Stefano Russo (2019– ) Administrator

See also
Roman Catholic Diocese of Matelica

Notes

Fabriano
Diocese
Religious organizations established in the 1720s
Fabriano-Matelica
1728 establishments in Italy
1728 establishments in the Papal States